Light of Faith, officially the Political Party for Justice and Development "Light of Faith" and sometimes translated as Beam of Conscience or Ray of Faith, is a political party in Kyrgyzstan. The party participated in the 2020 parliamentary elections, in which they garnered 66,747 votes (3.1%), which was below the 7% electoral threshold. In elections in 2021 for which the threshold was reduced to 5%, the party performed better, obtaining a 5.98% stake and five seats.

References

Political parties in Kyrgyzstan
Political parties established in 2012
Islamic democratic political parties